Justice Olufunlola Oyelola Adekeye is a Nigerian judge. She was the second woman to be appointed an Associate Justice of the Supreme Court of Nigeria (JSC).

Life
Adekeye attended St Anne's School Ibadan for her secondary school education. She served on the Court of Appeal before appointment to the Supreme Court. Her Supreme Court appointment, along with that of John Fabiyi, was confirmed by President Umaru Musa Yar'Adua on 6 March 2009.

In 2012 Justice Adekeye declared that "writing judgments is not for lazy jurists." She retired from the Supreme Court bench in November 2012. In a speech she made at her valedictory court session, she called for review of policies blocking married women from reaching the peak of their career in their husband's state of origin:

References

Year of birth missing (living people)
Living people
Supreme Court of Nigeria justices
Nigerian women judges
Constitutional court women judges
Nigerian women lawyers
St Anne's School, Ibadan alumni